Isnebol was the name of several places in the Ottoman Empire:

 Zenopolis, Isauria, an ancient city in southern Asia Minor
 Tran, Bulgaria